Marry Ntsweng (also spelled Mary Ntsweng; born 19 December 1989) is a South African women's footballer and plays as a midfielder. She plays for Tshwane University. She represented the South Africa women's national football team at the 2012 London Olympics.

References

Living people
1989 births
Women's association football midfielders
South African women's soccer players
South Africa women's international soccer players
Footballers at the 2012 Summer Olympics
Olympic soccer players of South Africa
People from Polokwane
Sportspeople from Limpopo